Ribeira da Barca is a town in the municipality of Santa Catarina, on the island of Santiago, Cape Verde. In 2010 its population was 2,317. It is situated on the west coast, at the mouth of the stream Ribeira da Barca, 11 km northwest of Assomada. The settlement was mentioned as "Rivera das Baras" in the 1747 map by Jacques-Nicolas Bellin.

Notable people
António Mascarenhas Monteiro, former president of the Republic of Cabo Verde
Suzanna Lubrano, singer currently residing in Rotterdam in the Netherlands
Tcheka, musician

References

External links

Geography of Santiago, Cape Verde
Santa Catarina, Cape Verde
Populated coastal places in Cape Verde
Towns in Cape Verde